Harry Christopher  "Chip" Caray III (born February 27, 1965) is an American television broadcaster for Bally Sports Midwest coverage of St. Louis Cardinals baseball. He joined the Cardinals broadcast team after leaving the Atlanta Braves, where he had served as the television play-by-play voice from 2005 to 2022. He is the son of broadcaster Skip Caray and the grandson of broadcaster Harry Caray.

Biography

Education and early career

Caray attended Parkway West High School in Chesterfield, Missouri. Caray graduated from the University of Georgia in 1987 with a degree in journalism. Well before his first big job with Fox, he worked with local television stations in Panama City, Florida, and Greensboro, North Carolina. He was the play-by-play broadcaster for the Orlando Magic of the NBA from 1989 to 1998.

While broadcasting with the Mariners, Caray received a two-game tryout with the St. Louis Cardinals. After the 1994 season, he was expected to sign with St. Louis, but chose instead to remain with Seattle.

Chicago Cubs

In 1998, Chip Caray was hired to work alongside his grandfather as broadcaster for the Chicago Cubs. Harry Caray died in February 1998, and Chip stayed with the team and took his grandfather's place as "the voice of the Cubs." He would go on to serve as their announcer for seven seasons, with Steve Stone providing the color commentary for most of those years. In 2004, both Caray and Stone left the Cubs booth after the season.

TBS
On the final day of the 2004 season, Caray announced that he had signed a long-term contract with both TBS and Clear Channel to work alongside his father, Skip, broadcasting games for the Atlanta Braves, staying closer to his family, who lived in Orlando, Florida. Chip Caray also became a broadcaster for TBS's college football coverage of the Big 12 and Pac-10.

In 2007, there was a major shake-up of the Braves broadcasters: Don Sutton departed to be the full-time broadcaster with the Washington Nationals, Skip Caray and Pete Van Wieren went to the Braves Radio Network full-time, and Joe Simpson signed with Fox Broadcasting Company to be a color analyst on FSN South and Sports South, and also signed to call a limited schedule of games on TBS with Chip Caray. It was announced that Caray would be a broadcaster for TBS and also would be the main play-by-play broadcaster for TBS during its coverage of the Major League Baseball playoffs. TBS would cover all Division Series games and the National League Championship Series. Hall of Fame player Tony Gwynn called the playoff games with Caray.

Caray was criticized for making factual mistakes  during postseason broadcasts on TBS. In response to such criticisms, Caray said, "It wasn't the job that I had when I came here in the first place. It would be like being a pinch-hitter or being a relief pitcher that works once every 10 days. I'm better when I work more."
On November 30, 2009, TBS announced that Caray and the network decided to part ways.

Fox Sports South

On December 21, 2009, Fox Sports South and SportSouth announced that Caray would be the play-by-play announcer for all 105 Braves games on the networks.  The deal also includes selected college basketball games on the regional sports networks.

Bally Sports Midwest

On January 23, 2023, it was announced Chip would become the play-by-play announcer for the St. Louis Cardinals, taking over for longtime broadcaster Dan McLaughlin.

Career timeline
 1989–1998: Orlando Magic Play-by-play
 1991–1992: Atlanta Braves play-by-play on TBS and Atlanta Braves Radio Network
 1993–1995: Seattle Mariners Play-by-play
 1996–1998: Major League Baseball on Fox Studio host
 1999–2000: Major League Baseball on Fox Play-by-play
 1998–2004: Chicago Cubs Play-by-play on WGN-TV and FSN Chicago
 2005–2009: Atlanta Braves Play-by-play on TBS, Peachtree TV and Atlanta Braves Radio Network
 2007–2009: MLB on TBS Lead play-by-play
 2010–2022: Atlanta Braves Baseball TV play-by-play on Bally Sports
 2023–Present: St. Louis Cardinals play-by-play on Bally Sports Midwest

Family

Chip Caray's grandfather, Harry, was a broadcaster famous for calling games of the St. Louis Cardinals, Chicago White Sox and Chicago Cubs. His father, Skip, was the longtime broadcaster for the Atlanta Braves until he died in 2008. Chip Caray occasionally imitates his father with sarcastic comments made in a high, nasal voice. Caray also has a half-brother, Josh Caray, who is the play-by-play announcer for the Rocket City Trash Pandas (the Class AA affiliate of the Los Angeles Angels).

Chip is married to Susan. They have three sons, Christopher, Stefan, and Tristan, and a daughter, Summerlyn. Caray's twin sons, Christopher and Stefan, attended the University of Georgia, and began their professional sportscasting career with the Amarillo Sod Poodles, a minor league team.

Notes

College basketball announcers in the United States
American radio sports announcers
American television sports announcers
Major League Baseball broadcasters
National Hockey League broadcasters
Atlanta Braves announcers
Atlanta Falcons announcers
Atlanta Thrashers announcers
Chicago Cubs announcers
Orlando Magic announcers
Place of birth missing (living people)
Seattle Mariners announcers
National Basketball Association broadcasters
People from Panama City, Florida
University of Georgia alumni
College football announcers
1965 births
Living people
American people of Italian descent
American people of Romanian descent
Radio personalities from Chicago
People from Ballwin, Missouri